Admiral Sir Edward Neville Syfret,  (20 June 1889 – 10 December 1972) was a senior officer in the Royal Navy who saw service in both World Wars. He was knighted for his part in Operation Pedestal, the critical Malta convoy, in the Second World War.

Naval career
Born the son of Edward Ridge Syfret of Cape Town in South Africa and educated at Diocesan College, South Africa and the Britannia Royal Naval College, Syfret joined the Royal Navy in 1904 and, in his early service years, specialised in naval gunnery. He played in a Navy v Army cricket match at Lord's in 1911 and 1912.

First World War 
In 1927 he was Fleet Gunnery Officer, Mediterranean Fleet.

Inter War Years 
With the rank of Commander he was appointed to HMS Volunteer in 1928 before promotion to Captain the following year. In 1932 he was put in command of HMS Caradoc on the China Station in 1932.

Second World War 
In 1939 he became Naval Secretary. He was made commander of the 18th Cruiser Squadron of the Home Fleet in 1941 and commanded the naval forces during Operation Ironclad, the invasion of Madagascar in May 1942 and was convoy commander for Operation Pedestal, a critical Malta Convoy in August 1942. Following Pedestal he was made a KCB "for bravery and dauntless resolution in fighting an important convoy through to Malta in the face of relentless attacks by day and night from enemy submarines, aircraft and surface forces."

He was appointed Commander of Force H later that year and then, in 1943, became Vice Chief of the Naval Staff.

After the war he became Commander-in-Chief of the Home Fleet; he retired in 1948.

Family
In 1913 he married Hildegarde Warner. They had one son and one daughter.

References

|-

|-

1889 births
1972 deaths
Lords of the Admiralty
Royal Navy officers of World War I
Royal Navy admirals of World War II
Knights Commander of the Order of the British Empire
Knights Grand Cross of the Order of the Bath
Commanders of the Legion of Merit
Alumni of Diocesan College, Cape Town
Recipients of the Croix de Guerre 1914–1918 (France)
Royal Navy cricketers
People from Cape Town
People educated at Stubbington House School
English cricketers
Admiralty personnel of World War II
Graduates of Britannia Royal Naval College